Robert William Thompson (5 March 1891 – 8 February 1918) was an Australian rules footballer who played with Melbourne University Football Club.

From the Victorian town of Cobden, he died at age 26 in 1918 after a suffering a brain tumour.

Sources

External links

1891 births
1918 deaths
Australian rules footballers from Victoria (Australia)
University Football Club players
Deaths from brain tumor
Deaths from cancer in Victoria (Australia)